Addison W. "King" Kelly (c. 1875 – March 23, 1942) was an American football and baseball player, coach of football, and stockbroker.  He played college football and college baseball at Princeton University, from which he graduated in 1898.  In 1896 and 1897, Addison was selected as a halfback on the College Football All-America Team.  He also played for four seasons as a first baseman on Princeton's baseball team.  In 1900, Kelly served as the head football coach at the University of California, Berkeley, compiling a record of 4–2–1.  He later worked as a stockbroker in association with several Wall Street firms.  Kelly died at the age of 66 on March 23, 1942, at Roosevelt Hospital in New York City.

Head coaching record

References

Year of birth uncertain
1870s births
1942 deaths
19th-century players of American football
American football halfbacks
American stockbrokers
Baseball first basemen
California Golden Bears football coaches
Princeton Tigers baseball players
Princeton Tigers football players
All-American college football players